Chartroose Caboose is a 1960 American comedy film directed by William 'Red' Reynolds and written by Rod Peterson. The film stars Molly Bee, Ben Cooper, Edgar Buchanan, Michael McGreevey, O. Z. Whitehead and Slim Pickens. The film was released on December 28, 1960, by Universal Pictures.

Plot

Cast 
Molly Bee as Doris Warren
Ben Cooper as Dub Dawson
Edgar Buchanan as Woodrow 'Woody' Watts
Michael McGreevey as Joey James
O. Z. Whitehead as J.B. King
Slim Pickens as Pete Harmon
Kay Bartels as Laura Warren
Winslow Cuthbert as Pastor Purdy
Mack Williams as Mr. Warren
Gilbert Reynolds as Newsboy

References

External links
 

1960 films
1960s English-language films
American comedy films
1960 comedy films
Universal Pictures films
1960s American films